Edward Charles Ericson (August 24, 1856 – February 8, 1910) was an American politician. He served in the South Dakota State Senate from 1889 to 1890. He also sat in the Dakota Territory Legislature from 1887 to 1889.

References

Members of the Dakota Territorial Legislature
19th-century American politicians
Republican Party South Dakota state senators
People from Elk Point, South Dakota
South Dakota lawyers
Swedish emigrants to the United States
1856 births
1910 deaths
19th-century American lawyers